is a Japanese yonkoma shōnen manga series by Chama. It was first published on Niconico Seiga and later in Kadokawa Shoten's 4-Koma Nano Ace magazine. The manga ran between March 2011 and April 2014. An anime television series adaptation aired between April and June 2013.

Plot 
The story centers around Amaya, Iwasawa, and Uehara—three "annoying, spirited high school girls with zero motivation"—and their classmates. Their daily life is "what happens when there is nothing happening."

Characters

Kanaka is the moodmaker. She is always looking to tease anyone within running distance, especially Saki and Ayuko. She has a habit of giving nicknames.

Saki is the tsukkomi to Kanaka's boke act. She is very tall and is very good at sports and games, but is otherwise unmotivated.

Ayuko is the middleman. The frequent butt of Kanaka's jokes and antics, she is constantly teased by Kanaka for being short.

Yanase is the class representative. She is very serious about everything. She is very competitive with her friend Manaka.

Nao is Yanase's friend, who always beats her in tests by a few points. She enjoys Kanaka's teasing of Yanase.

Souta is Kanaka's younger brother. Kanaka and her friends usually hang out at his room since Kanaka's room is uninhabitable.

Yamashita is the laid back homeroom teacher of Kanaka's class. She is often late for work and wears odd shirts.

Matsuno is a fired up math teacher. He catches tardy students at the gate and challenges them to a game of rock-paper-scissors, where he often throws a game.

Misuzu is an English teacher who is constantly mistaken for a schoolgirl. She is the homeroom teacher of class 1.

Izumi is Saki's rival and boke from class 1. She works part time at a convenience store with Saki.

Arisa is Izumi's friend and classmate. She is good in sports and games despite being very small.

Umi is the tsukkomi in class 1. She constantly worries about her weight.

Hiroko is Ayuko's older sister. She works as a manga artist and has a deep sister complex.

Media

Manga 
Aiura started as a 4-panel manga series, written and drawn by Chama. It was originally published online on Niconico Seiga, starting from 2 March 2011, and later in Kadokawa Shoten's 4-Koma Nano Ace magazine, starting from the 4th issue, published on 9 August 2011. Following the end of Nano Ace's publication, the series resumed serialization in Shōnen Ace magazine from its November 2013 issue. The manga series ended its run on 23 April 2014, and has been collected in seven compiled volumes between 3 February 2012, and 23 August 2014.

Anime 
The anime television series adaptation was produced by Liden Films, Pony Canyon, and Tohokushinsha Film Corporation. It was directed and written by Ryōsuke Nakamura, with character designs by Mieko Hosoi, and music by Shūsei Murai. The anime is formatted as a series of shorts, with each episode being only a few minutes in length. The series aired on TV Tokyo between 10 April to 26 June 2013, and was streamed by Niconico and with English subtitles by Crunchyroll. The series was released in its entirety on Blu-ray Disc on 7 August 2013.

Episode list

Notes

References

External links
 Official anime website 
 Aiura on Niconico Seiga 
 

Yonkoma
2011 manga
Japanese webcomics
Kadokawa Shoten manga
Kadokawa Dwango franchises
Liden Films
2013 anime television series debuts
Anime series based on manga
Slice of life anime and manga
Shōnen manga
2014 webcomic endings
2013 Japanese television series endings
Television shows based on Japanese webcomics
Webcomics in print
TV Tokyo original programming
2010s webcomics
Manga adapted into television series